Vifa is a Danish consumer electronics company that designs and manufactures audio products. The brand name stems from "Videbæk Højttalerfabrik" (eng: "The Videbæk Loudspeaker Factory"), originally founded in 1933 by N.C.Madsen, which manufactured dynamic loudspeaker drive units in the town of Videbæk. From 1981, operating under the acronym Vifa, the company quickly grew to become a respected OEM supplier for many high-end loudspeaker brands, until production seized in 2009.

With a turbulent history of changing ownership and periods of economic hardship, leading to several mergers and restructuring efforts, the Vifa brand is no longer associated with loudspeaker transducers. Since 2014, the current company is manufacturing a series of Bluetooth-enabled wireless loudspeaker systems for the consumer market, named after the capital cities of Scandinavian nations.

History

Founding 
The predecessor to Vifa was founded in 1933 by Niels Christian "N.C." Madsen, in the small town of Videbæk in western Denmark. Originally from the agricultural town of Hjerm near Holstebro, Madsen had developed a talent for mechanical and electrical engineering. At a time when electricity still wasn't available in many rural areas, he among other things converted car engines for use as stationary generators in the farming industry, and as he settled in Videbæk, he started a small automotive repair shop.

At the time, the Bang & Olufsen radio factory in Struer was importing electrodynamic loudspeaker drive units for their radio receivers out of France, and was looking to have them manufactured locally instead. They had approached Niels Christian Madsen's brother-in-law, who was a blacksmith, and although he was unable to meet their request, he instead put B&O in touch with Madsen. Together with two of his brothers, who were already employed at the Bang & Olufsen plant, Niels Christian Madsen started developing the required components. The experiments were successful, and Madsen's final designs were approved by B&O.

The early Videbæk speaker drive units were handmade, with metal parts manufactured in Madsen's auto workshop. Materials for the soft parts, such as cardboard diaphragms and leather suspensions, were sourced from local suppliers. Final assembly was taken care of by mrs. Madsen at the kitchen table. The business was eventually named "Videbæk Højttaler-fabrik" ("The Videbæk Loudspeaker Factory"), and in 1947, production moved into a dedicated factory building at Stationsvej 3, Videbæk.

In 1953, the "Aktieselskabet Videbæk Højttalerfabrik" corporation was formed, with N.C. Madsen as the only share owner. The product brand Hroswitha was at some point chosen for the transducers. The name is claimed to be an older spelling form of Videbæk, but likely just refers to the medieval Saxon poet of the same name.

Apart from B&O, other domestic radio manufacturers, such as SP Radio and Århus Radiolager, would be added to the customer list. Attempts were also made at export, although details are scarce on this point.

Norwegian ownership 
In 1961, preparing for his retirement, Niels Christian Madsen decided to sell the factory shares to his son, Carl Christian Nørgaard Madsen, and Radionette founder Jan Wessel, who by then had established their own loudspeaker manufacturing business in Norway, known by the name SEAS ("Skandinavisk Elektro-Akustisk Selskap"). After the acquisition, the SEAS name and model nomenclature was applied to products from both factories, although the Videbæk-made models would have the words "SEAS Hroswitha" stamped into their magnet steel caps.

The Danish and Norwegian factories had already collaborated to some extent during SEAS' startup in the late 40's, with the Videbæk factory supplying SEAS with inner suspension parts, which were difficult to manufacture to precision. The two now experienced great growth together, and were formally made sister companies in 1971. While the facilities in Moss, Norway focused on technological development and production at the higher end of the product stack, the Videbæk factory continued to manufacture more traditional and lower-cost products.

Conflict 
The global economic turmoil of the seventies, compounded by frequent strikes, meant that changes had to be made in order to remain competitive. A new General Manager was appointed from the Danish arm in 1977, but decisions made in the following years, increasingly partial to the Videbæk factory, would cause escalating conflict between the two manufacturing sites. Among other things, attempts were made to covertly transfer the most profitable technology and equipment to Videbæk. The transports were deemed illegal, however, and halted at the border.

Attempts were also made to hand off the Moss factory, but a sale never materialized. Preparations were then initiated for the Norwegian site to be closed instead. This in turn was prevented when unions and politicians became involved. The strategy again shifted, this time in order to separate the two factories. The Videbæk premises were subsequently mortgaged, with the Danish stock as collateral, and a one-day-notice 1,3 million DKK default forced upon SEAS. The Videbæk factory was thus dropped into the hands of Ringkøbing Landbobank and the Danish management.

Reestablisment 
Nearly succeeding in bankrupting SEAS, the Danish site broke away in 1981, creating its own identity under the brand name "Vifa" (an abbreviation of "Videbæk Fabrikker"). While the first Vifa products were simply rebadged SEAS units, predominantly made using SEAS-owned tools, Vifa would develop and bring to market their own complete range of loudspeaker drivers over the next few years, rising to become a major player in the European loudspeaker business. A US subsidiary was established in 1982.

With the acquisition of high-end manufacturer Scan-Speak in 1987-89, the Vifa-Speak A/S corporation was formed. Vifa continued to gear their production towards higher quality speaker drivers, and the resulting "Premium Line" models entered the market in the mid-90's. Scan-Speak kept its autonomy in research and development, and after production was eventually moved to Videbæk, they benefited from Vifa's infrastructure and finances.

Consolidation attempts 
In 2000, Vifa and Scan-Speak took over the shares of troubled fellow Danish loudspeaker manufacturer Peerless Fabrikkerne AS. Together, they formed DST (Danish Sound Technology). The products would still be marketed under the old brand names, in addition to an all-new Logic brand.

Together, the two manufacturers represented some of the finest know-how in the loudspeaker business, but combining the manufacturing structures would prove difficult. While Vifa-Speak's production made extensive use of standardized sub-assembly, allowing for great flexibility, Peerless' manufacturing closely resembled a sequential production line, which placed different requirements on e.g. the curing time of glue and other chemicals. Also, while the latter was suitable for uniform high-volume production, flexibility would carry an intrinsic cost.

Peerless, while widely renowned for quality and with a history even predating the Videbæk factory, had at the time been unable to turn a profit for two decades. Further economic constraints soon forced the new company to look for investors. In order to generate funds, the Vifa brand was sold off, and in 2005, the Cupertino, California based startup company Tymphany acquired DST. It is believed that Tymphany at least partly wanted to secure manufacturing facilities for their LAT ("Linear Array Transducer", first shown at CES 2005) line of subwoofers, although those products wouldn't prove very successful in the market. Financial concerns eventually led to the establishment of manufacturing plants in China, and in 2009, the entire production of loudspeakers was moved there, except for the Scan-Speak branch, which would eventually end up in ownership of a group of original management and engineers.

Legacy and resurrection 
Around the time of the Tymphany acquisition, the Vifa brand was used by Chinese investors to market home theatre systems, including A/V receivers and compact 5.1 channel loudspeaker sets. Although it is unclear when this product range was introduced and discontinued, and which regions they were sold in, it seems to have been a relatively short-lived affair. Products that seem identical have been observed carrying other brand names.

Tymphany, now headquartered in Hong Kong, kept the Peerless brand and continued the manufacture of Peerless' original designs as "Peerless by Tymphany" with the traditional 6-digit produck codes. Later designs have carried both Peerless and Tymphany brands. Parts of the old Vifa product range was continued as "Peerless V-Line", although only a few of these products are currently (2022) found in the catalogue.

A small portion of Vifa's classic loudspeaker drive unit programme is still manufactured by Scan-Speak, who now reside in Videbæk, Denmark.

Timeline 
 1933: Videbæk Højttalerfabrik is founded by N. C. Madsen, and starts supplying loudspeaker drive units to radio manufacturers.
 1947: Vifa moves into a dedicated factory building at Stationsvej 3, Videbæk.
 1953: The business is incorporated as "Aktieselskabet Videbæk Højttalerfabrik", with N.C. Madsen as the sole share owner.
 1961: N.C. Madsen sells all shares of Videbæk Højttalerfabrik to his son C.C. Nørgaard-Madsen and Jan Wessel, owners of SEAS Fabrikker A/S, Norway.
 1965: Videbæk Højttalerfabrik A/S invests in the construction of an anechoic chamber.
 1971: The factory in Videbæk becomes a sister company to SEAS Fabrikker A/S. 
 1972: Manufacturing expands into complete loudspeaker systems.
 1977: Export of transducers from Videbæk is initiated.
 1981: Vifa is established as an independent company.
 1987-1991: Vifa acquires the Scan-Speak operation and Vifa-Speak A/S is formed, continuing the manufacture of both brands.
 1991: Scan-Speak moves to facilities in Videbæk, and their trademark is transferred from Dantax Radioindustri A/S to Videbæk Højttalerfabrik A/S.
 1997: Vifa-Speak A/S acquires a 40% share in Peerless Fabrikkerne AS.
 2000: Vifa-Speak A/S takes over the remaining Peerless stock to form Danish Sound Technology (DST). A manufacturing facility is established in Pan Yu, China.
 2003: The Vifa brand is sold to the Chinese company GGEC (Guoguang Electric Corp.), and Vifa International A/S is established in Rødovre, Denmark, marketing Vifa-branded A/V systems that are manufactured in Zhongshan, China.
 2005: DST is acquired by Silicon Valley startup Tymphany, and production of transducers is gradually moved to Xin Xu, China.
 2008: Tymphany's operations in China are sold to local operators.
 2009: Tymphany Denmark A/S sells Scan-Speak to the local Danish management. Some of Vifa's original production tools are included, and a small number of Vifa models are continued under the Scan-Speak Discovery brand.
 2009: Vifa Denmark A/S is founded in Viborg, operating within the consumer market.
 2014: Vifa Denmark A/S acquires the Vifa brand from GGEC.

Technology 
 1994: Vifa engineers design a pentagon-shaped diaphragm, which reduces the severity of cone edge resonances. Named 'NRSC' (Non-Resonant Suspension Coupling), the technology is initially employed in Vifa's Premium Line woofers.
 1999: The XT-series Ring Radiator tweeter is launched under the Vifa brand. Scan-Speak engineers later refine the technology to make their own top-end models.

Rebirth 
After gradually disappearing from its traditional grounds following the Tymphany merger, the Vifa brand was revived in Viborg, Denmark in 2014, this time focused on household and lifestyle audio products. Trading on classic Nordic design, and naming their designs after Nordic cities, the new company announced its first wireless speaker, Copenhagen, adorned with textiles from the Danish textile manufacturer, Kvadrat, and supporting Apple Airplay.

Vifa also makes their own exclusive Bluetooth-based wireless speakers, with the first model being Oslo, followed by the portable bluetooth speaker, Helsinki in 2016 and Hi-Fi bookshelf speaker, Copenhagen and Hi-Fi soundbar, Stockholm.

Design 
Vifa products are regarded for their Nordic inspired design.

Current products 
 Helsinki
 Oslo
 Copenhagen
 Stockholm
 Reykjavik
 City

Collaboration with other brands 
To establish itself on the international market, Vifa was represented by the sales company SISO. For a brief period around 1980, export units would therefore also carry the SISO logo.

From the 1980s and well into the new millennium, Vifa-built speaker drivers were highly popular among respected loudspeaker brands, such as Aerial Acoustics, Apogee Electronics, Dali, Snell Acoustics, Vandersteen Audio, and many more.

Vifa collaborated with Danish textile manufacturer, Kvadrat, to design its wireless Bluetooth speakers.

See also 
 Bang & Olufsen
 Dali
 Cambridge Audio

References 



Danish companies established in 1933
Audio equipment manufacturers of Denmark
Loudspeaker manufacturers
Companies based in Viborg Municipality